Cap-Rouge is a former city in central Quebec, Canada,  since 2002 within the borough Sainte-Foy–Sillery–Cap-Rouge in Quebec City. The site of the first attempted permanent French settlement in North America, Charlesbourg-Royal, is located at the confluence of the Rivière du Cap Rouge and the Saint Lawrence River. Its population was 13,153 as of the Canada 2011 Census.

First permanent establishments
In 1635, the first seigneurie was granted on the territory of Cape-Rouge, but revoked the following year by the Company of One Hundred Associates. However, by 1638 Paul Le Jeune, a missionary Jesuit, had noted in The Jesuit Relations the presence of some families in the valley. Between 1647 and 1652, the seigneuries of Maur, on the west, and Gaudarville, in the east, were established on the territory. From that moment, based on taxable citizens, the settlement on the lands of Cap-Rouge are established. The village formed is served by the parishes of Ancienne-Lorette in (1678) to the north; of Saint-Augustin in (1691) on the west; and of Sainte-Foy (1698) in the eEast.

Geography

The name of Cap-Rouge, meaning "red cape", comes from its cliffs facing the Saint-Lawrence river and made of schist rock bearing a reddish tint. The other main topographic feature of Cap-Rouge is the Rivière du Cap Rouge valley where are concentrated some historic buildings as well the archeological remains of a pottery workshop active from 1860 to 1892. It is believed that until the end of its operations the workshop mainly used imported clay rather than the local one, which has a rather red hue.

The Cap-Rouge area is located to the south of the Canadian Shield and Laurentian Mountains, at the confluence of the geological regions of the Saint Lawrence Lowlands and of the northern Appalachians. It mostly sits at the western foot of the Quebec promontory, in the way of the Logan's Line - an inactive fracture in the Earth's crust first documented by William Edmond Logan.

Attractions

In addition to its long history, the main attraction of Cap-Rouge is the towering Cap-Rouge trestle rail-road bridge. Built in 1907-1908, the steel trestle was constructed under the authority of the National Transcontinental as part of the National Transcontinental Railway. It spans 3,335 feet at an average of 172 feet above ground and is still in use today.

See also
Charlesbourg-Royal
History of French colonization of the Americas

References

Neighbourhoods in Quebec City
Former municipalities in Quebec
1635 establishments in the French colonial empire
Populated places disestablished in 2002